Momin Khan Biltoon, also known as his honorific title Ustad Beltoon, was an Afghan Pashtun singer from Kabul Province, Afghanistan. He was born in Chakari village of Khaki Jabbar District, Kabul. However, he spent most of his life in Logar Province of Afghanistan. Biltoon sang in both Pashto and Dari languages. His style of music reflects the Kharabat style of Kabul. Biltoon's father died before he was born, and his mother did so when he was young. He was raised by his sister in Logar Province of Afghanistan. Biltoon learned the rubab and tanbur at a young age. He started singing at the age of 15. His first song was in both Persian and Pashto.

Having made contributions to Afghan traditional music for over 70 years, Biltoon died at the age of 95 in Kabul. He was buried in Beni Hesar of Kabul.

References

Date of birth missing
2015 deaths
20th-century Afghan male singers
Persian-language singers
Pashto-language singers